Gongsan may refer to:
Gongsan-dong, neighbourhood of Dong-gu, Daegu, South Korea
Palgongsan, mountain in southeastern South Korea
Gongju, city in South Chungcheong, South Korea
Gongsan-myeon, township in Naju, South Jeolla, South Korea; see list of townships in South Korea

People with the name Gongsan include:
Deng Guangming (1907–1998), courtesy name Gongsan, Chinese historian

See also
Gongsandang (disambiguation)
Gongsan Dam, dam in Daegu, South Korea